Ariel Guillermo Amaya (born in Buenos Aires, Argentina) is a former Argentine footballer who played for clubs of Argentina, Chile, Mexico and Ecuador.

References
 

Living people
Argentine footballers
Argentine expatriate footballers
Olimpo footballers
Tigres UANL footballers
S.D. Quito footballers
Everton de Viña del Mar footballers
C.D. Victoria players
Primera B de Chile players
Chilean Primera División players
Expatriate footballers in Chile
Expatriate footballers in Mexico
Expatriate footballers in Ecuador
Expatriate footballers in Honduras
Association football forwards
Year of birth missing (living people)
Footballers from Buenos Aires